Furnivall or Furnival is a surname. Notable people with the surname include:

 Frederick James Furnivall (1825–1910), co-creator of the New English Dictionary
 Kate Furnivall British historical novelist 
 Percy Furnivall (1868–1938), British surgeon
 John Sydenham Furnivall (1878–1960), British civil servant in Burma
 Gerard de Furnival, Norman knight